Dollarhide Mountain, at  above sea level is a peak in the Smoky Mountains of Idaho. The peak is located in Sawtooth National Forest on the border of Blaine and Camas counties. Forest road 227 travels near the peak over a road pass known as Dollarhide Summit. No roads or trails go to the summit.

References 

Mountains of Idaho
Mountains of Blaine County, Idaho
Mountains of Camas County, Idaho
Sawtooth National Forest